Bogdan (1363), was a kaznac (chamberlain) in the service of Serbian Emperor Uroš V (r. 1355–1371).

Life
In 1354, A Bogdan, the son of noblewoman Višeslava was mentioned; this was either Bogdan Kirizmić or kaznac Bogdan.  Bogdan, as a kaznac, was mentioned in a charter dating to July 15, 1363, which regulated the substitution of the župa (county) of Zvečan and the town of Brvenik, between knez Vojislav Vojinović and čelnik Musa. The document mentions that Bogdan held the village of Glušce in the Brvenik župa.

His son, Nenad, built the fortified town of Koprijan, during the rule of Prince Lazar, according to an inscription found in the Niš Fortress.

References

14th-century Serbian nobility
People of the Serbian Empire
14th-century births
14th-century deaths
Kaznac
History of Kosovo
Kosovo Serbs